Bashaw may refer to:

Places
Canada
Bashaw, Alberta
Bashaw Airport
United States
Bashaw, Wisconsin, a town
Bashaw, Burnett County, Wisconsin, an unincorporated community
Bashaw Township, Brown County, Minnesota

Others
Mose Bashaw (1889–1933), an American football tackle
Bashaw, another name for the Flathead catfish 
USS Bashaw (SS-241), a Gato-class submarine named for the fish
Bashaw (Matthew Cotes Wyatt), a marble sculpture by Matthew Cotes Wyatt
Pasha or bashaw, a rank in the Ottoman Empire